Julia Rios is an American writer, editor, podcaster, and narrator.

Biography
Born in the United States, Rios is partly of Mexican descent. They have won a number of awards for their work in Science Fiction and Fantasy and has even more nominations. They have hosted a number of podcasts including Outer Alliance and The Skiffy and Fanty Show. Rios has also been an editor for several of the genres biggest name magazines such as Strange Horizons, Uncanny Magazine and Fireside Magazine. They have also worked as a narrator for PodCastle and Pseudopod. Rios is a co-founders of Fuente Collective. In 2019 the Science Fiction and Fantasy Writers of America awarded them the Kevin O'Donnell Jr. award for establishing of the SFWA mentoring initiative. Rios has a strong interest in diversity, especially in queer and Latinx communities.

Awards
 2019 SFWA Kevin O’Donnell, Jr. Service Award

Hugo Awards
 2017 Uncanny Magazine
 2018 Uncanny Magazine

 Aurealis Awards 
 2017: Year's Best YA Speculative Fiction 2015 (JR & Alisa Krasnostein, eds.) (Twelfth Planet)
 2015: Kaleidoscope: Diverse YA Science Fiction and Fantasy Stories (Alisa Krasnostein & JR, eds.) (Twelfth Planet Press)

 Ditmar Awards
 2015: Kaleidoscope (Alisa Krasnostein & JR, eds.) (Twelfth Planet)

Bibliography
 Fireside Magazine
 Fireside Quarterly
 Year's Best Young Adult Speculative Fiction
 Year's Best YA Speculative Fiction 2013 (2014) with Alisa Krasnostein
 Year's Best YA Speculative Fiction 2014 (2016) with Alisa Krasnostein
 Year's Best Young Adult Speculative Fiction 2015 (2016) with Alisa Krasnostein
 In Other Words (2014) with Saira Ali
 Kaleidoscope: Diverse YA Science Fiction and Fantasy Stories (2014) with Alisa Krasnostein

References and sources

21st-century American women writers
LGBT women
American women editors
Year of birth missing (living people)
Living people